The following highways are numbered 115:

Canada
 New Brunswick Route 115
 Ontario Highway 115
 Prince Edward Island Route 115
 Winnipeg Route 115

Costa Rica
 National Route 115

India
 National Highway 115 (India)

Italy
 State road 115

Japan
 Route 115 (Japan)

Philippines
 N115 highway (Philippines)

United States
 Interstate 115
 Alabama State Route 115
 Arkansas Highway 115
 Arkansas Highway 115 (former)
 California State Route 115
 Colorado State Highway 115
 Connecticut Route 115
 Florida State Road 115
 County Road 115A (Duval County, Florida)
 County Road 115C (Duval County, Florida)
 Georgia State Route 115
 Illinois Route 115
 Indiana State Road 115
 Iowa Highway 115 (former)
 K-115 (Kansas highway)
 Kentucky Route 115
 Louisiana Highway 115
 Maine State Route 115
 Maryland Route 115
 Massachusetts Route 115
 M-115 (Michigan highway)
 Minnesota State Highway 115
 Missouri Route 115
 Nevada State Route 115
 New Hampshire Route 115
 New Hampshire Route 115A
 County Route 115 (Bergen County, New Jersey)
 New Mexico State Road 115
 New York State Route 115
 County Route 115 (Cortland County, New York)
 County Route 115 (Erie County, New York)
 County Route 115 (Onondaga County, New York)
 County Route 115 (Steuben County, New York)
 County Route 115 (Suffolk County, New York)
 County Route 115 (Sullivan County, New York)
 County Route 115 (Tompkins County, New York)
 County Route 115M (Tompkins County, New York)
 North Carolina Highway 115
 Ohio State Route 115
 Oklahoma State Highway 115
 Pennsylvania Route 115
 Rhode Island Route 115
 South Dakota Highway 115
 Tennessee State Route 115
 Texas State Highway 115
 Texas State Highway Spur 115
 Texas State Highway Spur 115 (1940–1942) (former)
 Farm to Market Road 115
 Utah State Route 115
 Vermont Route 115 (former)
 Virginia State Route 115
 Virginia State Route 115 (1923-1928) (former)
 Virginia State Route 115 (1928-1933) (former)
 Washington State Route 115
 West Virginia Route 115
 Wisconsin Highway 115

Territories
 Puerto Rico Highway 115
 Puerto Rico Highway 115R (former)

See also
A115
D115 road
P115
R115 road (Ireland)
S115 (Amsterdam)